GyeonggiGwangju Station is a railway station on Gyeonggang Line of the Seoul Metropolitan Subway. Its located at Yeok-dong, Gwangju, Gyeonggi, South Korea.

Station Layout

External links

Metro stations in Gwangju, Gyeonggi
Seoul Metropolitan Subway stations
Railway stations opened in 2016
Gyeonggang Line
Korail stations